The 1903 Illinois Fighting Illini football team was an American football team that represented the University of Illinois during the 1903 college football season.  In their first season under head coach George Washington Woodruff, the Illini compiled an 8–6 record and finished in seventh place in the Western Conference. Guard/end Claude Rothgeb was the team captain.

Schedule

References

Illinois
Illinois Fighting Illini football seasons
Illinois Fighting Illini football